The Corps de l'armement, or corps des ingénieurs de l'armement is a Technical Grand Corps of the French State (grand corps de l'Etat), aimed at providing the French Armed Forces with all appropriate equipment and at supervising the French Aerospace & Defence industry.

Its members are the ingénieurs de l'armement, or ingénieurs du corps de l'armement, nicknamed "IA" in French. They are high level engineers and public servants with military status, originating for most of them (more than 2/3 by decree) from Ecole polytechnique and trained at Institut supérieur de l'aéronautique et de l'espace (ISAE) (formation SUPAERO), ENSTA Paris or other French or international universities.

The Corps de l'armement's main employer (50%) is the Direction générale de l'armement (General Directorate for Armament). The second half are employed in other bodies of the Ministry of Defence, in international Defence organizations (NATO, OCCAR,...) or can be detached in French administrative bodies (CNES, CEA, ESA,...) or the French and European industry (EADS, Safran, Thales Group, MBDA, DCNS...).

Prehistory of the Corps of Armament 

The Corps of Armament was created in 1968 as a fusion of previous Corps of military engineers recruiting at Ecole polytechnique
 Corps of Aeronautics engineers (corps des ingénieurs de l'air - or de l'aéronautique)
 Corps of naval engineers (corps du génie maritime)
 Corps of Powders and Explosives engineers (corps des ingénieurs des poudres et explosifs)
 Corps of Military Telecom engineers (corps des ingénieurs des télécom militaires)
 Corps of Armament Fabrications engineers (corps des ingénieurs des fabrications d'armement)

In 1743, the "Ecole des constructeurs de vaisseaux royaux" was created to train Naval engineers. This school is known today as ENSTA ParisTech.

Corps of Armament and High tech Colbertism 

The role played by the Corps of Armament in the development of the French Aerospace & Defence industry in particular with the logic of Grands Projets (Concorde, Airbus, Ariane,...) can be compared with the role of the Corps des télécommunications in the development of the French telecom industry (telephone, Minitel,...) or the role of the Corps des mines or the Corps des ponts with their respective Grands Projets (Nuclear industry, TGV,...). They illustrate the Colbertism, a French version of Mercantilism.

French Colbertism is an old tradition dating back to the 17th century influenced at that time by the Chinese system. French high public servants are still nicknamed "mandarins" referring to their Chinese counterparts.

The French economist Elie Cohen described the effects of French Colbertism in the field of High tech in a renowned book entitled "High tech Colbertism - Economics of the Grand Projet" (1995).

High tech Colbertism can be characterized by a prevalent role played in France by the Administration and the Grand Corps. A typical Colbertist mechanism is the "pantouflage" where top civil servants become Heads of French public companies. The word "pantouflage" cannot be directly translated in English nor in any Western language but can be translated in Japanese where a comparable mechanism exists. The Japanese word is "amakudari" ("fallen from the sky").

Notable members of the Corps de l'armement

Heads of the  Direction générale de l'armement 

 Henri Martre, délégué général pour l'armement (1977-1983), CEO Aérospatiale (1983-1992)
 Yves Sillard, Director general of CNES (1976-1982), CEO IFREMER (1982-1989), délégué général pour l'armement (1989-1993)

Heads of other public bodies 

 Frédéric van Roekeghem, director of the French national health insurance fund.
 Pierre-Henri Gourgeon, former directeur général de l'aviation civile and Directeur général d'Air France.
 Alain Bugat, headed the Commissariat à l'énergie atomique (2003-2009).
 Guillaume Poupard, CEO of the French National Cybersecurity Agency.

Top industrialists 

 Jean-Paul Herteman, CEO Safran, Chairman of GIFAS, Vice Chairman of Conseil général de l'armement.
 Marwan Lahoud, Head of EADS France, former CEO of MBDA.
 Henri Martre, Délégué général pour l'armement (1977-1983), CEO Aérospatiale (1983-1992).
 Serge Tchuruk, president of  Total, then Alcatel Lucent.

Aerospace engineers 
 René Audran, Director of International Affairs at DGA, assassinated by Action directe in 1985.
 Jean-Marie Bastien-Thiry, famous for attempting to assassinate French president Charles de Gaulle in 1962.
 Roger Béteille, one of the founders of Airbus.
 Jean-François Clervoy, astronaut.
 François Hussenot, credited with the invention of one of the early forms of the flight data recorder.
 Henri Ziegler, one of the founders of Airbus.

Naval, nuclear & telecom engineers 
 Louis-Émile Bertin, naval engineer.
 Nicolas Léonard Sadi Carnot, physicist described as the father of thermodynamics.
 Raymond Adolphe Séré de Rivières, fortification engineer and general.

Grades 
   Engineer-General, Exceptional Class  (IGCEA), relative rank as général d'armée
  Engineer-General, Senior Class  (IGHCA), relative rank as général de corps d'armée
  Engineer-General, First Class (IG1A), relative rank as général de division
  Engineer-General, Second Class  (IG2A), relative rank as général de brigade
  Chief Engineer (with two years in the grade) (ICA), relative rank as Colonel
  Chief Engineer Second Class (with less than two years in the grade)  (ICA), relative rank as Lieutenant-colonel, 
  Principal Engineers (IPA), relative rank as Major
  Engineer (step 4 to 9)  (IA), relative rank as Captain
  Engineer (step 2 to 4) (IA), relative rank as First Lieutenant
  Engineer (step 1) (IA), relative rank as Second Lieutenant

References

See also 
 Direction générale de l'armement
 Grands corps de l'Etat
 Corps des mines
 Corps des ponts
 Corps des télécommunications
 Corps de l'INSEE
 Colbertism
 High tech Colbertism
 Mercantilism

 
armement
French engineers
armement